Saint-Arroman may refer to the following places in France:

Saint-Arroman, Gers, a commune in the Gers department 
Saint-Arroman, Hautes-Pyrénées, a commune in the Hautes-Pyrénées department